Flaser beds are a sedimentary, bi-directional, bedding pattern created when a sediment is exposed to intermittent flows, leading to alternating sand and mud layers.  While flaser beds typically form in tidal environments, they can (rarely) form in fluvial conditions - on point bars or in ephemeral streams, or also in deep water environments when turbiditic sediments are reworked by seasonal bottom-currents. Individual sand ripples are created, which are later infilled by mud during quieter flow periods. These mud drapes are typically a minor constituent of the deposit; they can consolidate within three hours, protecting the underlying layer from erosion. Flaser bedding typically forms in high-energy environments.

In contrast to lenticular bedding which largely consists of mud relative to small amounts of sand, flaser bedding is dominated by sand with small amounts of mud interspersed.

References

Sedimentary structures